Oghul Qaimish (died 1251) was the principal wife of Güyük Khan and ruled as regent over the Mongol Empire after the death of her husband in 1248. She was a descendant of the Mergid tribe. However, H. H. Howorth believed that she was an Oirat, mistaking her for Oghul Tutmish, wife of Möngke.

Life 
She was given as wife to Güyük after Genghis Khan put down the rebellion of her clan in 1216–1219. Oghul Qaimish bore Güyük two sons, Khoja and Naqu. When her husband died in Qum-Sengir in Turkestan, she brought his ordo in the Ögedeids' appanage in Emil-Qobaq region in 1248. Güyük's chief officials, Chinqai, Qadaq and Bala, helped Oghul to serve as regent. She spent her time with the Mongol shamans and lacked her mother-in-law Töregene's political skills. While her sons, Naqu and Khoja, and Shiremun, the grandson of Ögedei, attempted to secure their claims on the throne, Chagatayid Khan and Yesü Möngke primarily supported Oghul Qaimish.

Before or during the regency of Oghul, her husband's general Eljigidei sent an embassy to Louis IX of France to offer an alliance against the Muslims. Louis sent his men headed by André de Longjumeau in reply, but after she received them at her ordo on Emil, Oghul Qaimish sent them back with presents and letters announcing the Mongol demand for submission.

In 1249, Batu arranged a kurultai where Möngke was chosen as Khagan at Ala Qamaq in the Ulus of Jochi. Oghul declined Batu's invitation and sent Bala to that assembly with a demand that Shiremun or one of the Ögedeids be elected khan. When the Toluids and the Golden Horde organized a second kurultai on the Kherlen River in 1251, which officially proclaimed Möngke Khan, Oghul Qaimish refused, with her son Khoja, to come. Most of the Ögedeid and Chagataid princes supported her.

After her opponent, Möngke, was elected in 1251, Oghul Qaimish's sons and Shiremun attempted to overthrow Möngke. When the plot was discovered, Khoja was exiled to the South China front and Shiremun was executed. Oghul Qaimish and Shiremun's mother Qadaqach were summoned to court and arrested. When Oghul Qaimish was stripped naked, she was angry with Sorghaghtani and other imperial women who questioned her in closed ger. After torture she was executed by being wrapped in felt and flung into a river. She was conferred the posthumous name Empress Qinshu (欽淑皇后) by Kublai in 1266.

References

Citations

Sources 

 Jack Weatherford. The Secret History of the Mongol Queens: How the Daughters of Genghis Khan Rescued His Empire's Crown (2010)

Mongol empresses
Year of birth missing
13th-century viceregal rulers
13th-century women rulers
1251 deaths
House of Ögedei
13th-century Mongolian women